Sir Titus Salt, 1st Baronet (20 September 1803 in Morley – 29 December 1876 in Lightcliffe), was a manufacturer, politician and philanthropist in Bradford, West Riding of Yorkshire, England, who is best known for having built Salt's Mill, a large textile mill, together with the attached village of Saltaire, West Yorkshire.

Early life
Titus Salt was born in 1803 to Daniel Salt, a drysalter and then a sheep farmer, and Grace Smithies, daughter of Isaac Smithies, of The Manor House, Morley. His father sent him to a school in Batley, identified in some sources as Batley Grammar School, and then to another near Wakefield, named in some sources as Heath School. Between 1813 and 1819 the Salt family lived at The Manor House in Morley, before moving to Crofton, near Wakefield.

Career
After working for two years as a wool-stapler in Wakefield (between 1820 and 1822), Salt became his father's partner in the business of Daniel Salt and Son. The company used Russian Donskoi wool, which was widely used in the woollens trade but not in worsted cloth. Titus visited the spinners in Bradford trying to interest them in using the wool for worsted manufacture, with no success so he set up as a spinner and manufacturer.

In 1836, Salt came upon some bales of Alpaca wool in a warehouse in Liverpool and, after taking some samples away to experiment, came back and bought the consignment. Though he was not the first in England to work with the fibre, he was the creator of the lustrous and subsequently fashionable cloth called 'alpaca'. (The discovery was described by Charles Dickens in a slightly fictionalised form in the magazine Household Words).

In 1833, he took over his father's business and within twenty years had expanded it to be the largest employer in Bradford.

Salt was Chief Constable of Bradford before its incorporation as a borough in 1847 and afterwards a senior alderman. He was the second mayor in office from 1848 to 1849 and was later Deputy Lieutenant for the West Riding of Yorkshire. Smoke and pollution emanated from mills and factory chimneys, and Salt tried in 1842 unsuccessfully to clean up the pollution using a device called the Rodda Smoke Burner.

In 1848, by now the senior Alderman of Bradford, Salt became Liberal MP. Around 1850, he lost the seat and decided to build a mill large enough to consolidate his textile manufacture in one place, but he "did not like to be a party to increasing that already over-crowded borough" and bought land three miles from the town in Shipley next to the River Aire, the Leeds and Liverpool Canal and the Midland Railway. In 1851, he began building the model village of Saltaire. He opened Saltaire Mills, now known as Salt's Mill with a grand banquet on his 50th birthday, 20 September 1853 and set about building houses, bathhouses, an institute, hospital, almshouses and churches. 
In 1857, Salt was President of the Bradford Chamber of Commerce. In 1858–59, he built the congregational church, which is now Saltaire United Reformed Church, at his own expense  and donated the land on which the Wesleyan chapel was built by public subscription in 1866–68. He forbade 'beershops' in Saltaire, but the common supposition that he was teetotal himself is untrue. He was a county Justice of the peace and also a Deputy Lord Lieutenant.
 
Salt was a private man and left no written statement of his purposes in creating Saltaire, but he told Lord Harewood at the opening that he had built the place "to do good and to give his sons employment".

In David James's assessment:
"Salt's motives in building Saltaire remain obscure. They seem to have been a mixture of sound economics, Christian duty, and a desire to have effective control over his workforce. There were economic reasons for moving out of Bradford, and the village did provide him with an amenable, handpicked workforce. Yet Salt was deeply religious and sincerely believed that, by creating an environment where people could lead healthy, virtuous, godly lives, he was doing God's work. Perhaps, also, diffident and inarticulate as he was, the village may have been a way of demonstrating the extent of his wealth and power. Lastly, he may also have seen it as a means of establishing an industrial dynasty to match the landed estates of his Bradford contemporaries. However, Saltaire provided no real solution to the relationship between employer and worker. Its small size, healthy site, and comparative isolation provided an escape rather than an answer to the problems of urban industrial society".

From 1859 until he retired through ill health on 1 February 1861 Salt served as Liberal Member of Parliament for Bradford. On 30 October 1869, he was created a Baronet, of Saltaire and Crow Nest in the County of York.

Personal life and death
On 21 August 1830, Salt married Caroline, daughter of George Whitlam, of Great Grimsby and had they had eleven children; six sons and five daughters. The children of salt all have a street named after them in the village of Saltaire.
 Sir William Henry Salt, 2nd baronet (11 December 1831 – 1892), married in 1854 Emma Dove Octaviana Harris (d1904), only child of John Dove Harris and Emma Shirley of Knighton, Leicester
 George Salt (22 April 1833 – 8 May 1913) married in 1875, Jennie Louisa Fresco of Florence
 Edward Salt of Bathampton House (3 April 1837 – 24 October 1903) married firstly in 1861, Mary Jane Susan, eldest daughter of Samuel Elgood, of Leicester; and secondly, married in 1871, Sarah Amelie, elder daughter of William Rouse, of Burley House, York
 Herbert Salt (17 April 1840 – 21 July 1912) married firstly, in 1889, Elizabeth, daughter of John Douglas Ferrell; and married secondly, in 1899, Margaret, widow of Christopher Robert de Lacey
 Titus Salt DL JP (28 August 1843 – 19 November 1887) married in 1866, Catherine, eldest surviving daughter of Joseph Crossley of Broomfield, Halifax, niece of Sir Francis Crossley, 1st Bt.

In 1876 Salt died at Crow Nest, Lightcliffe, near Halifax and was buried at Saltaire Congregational Church. "Estimates vary, but the number of people lining the route [of the funeral] probably exceeded 100,000."

See also
Joseph Rowntree (philanthropist)
George Cadbury
Lever Brothers

References

Bibliography

 

Valentine, S. R, Sir Titus Salt: The Founder of Saltaire and its Mill, Themelios Publishing, London, 2021.

1803 births
1876 deaths
Baronets in the Baronetage of the United Kingdom
Businesspeople from Bradford
British textile industry businesspeople
People from Morley, West Yorkshire
Liberal Party (UK) MPs for English constituencies
People educated at Batley Grammar School
UK MPs 1859–1865
Mayors of Bradford
Burials in West Yorkshire
English Congregationalists
19th-century English businesspeople